Sergei Kosorotov (born 15 April 1965) is a Russian judoka.

Achievements

References

External links
 

1965 births
Living people
Russian male judoka
Judoka at the 1996 Summer Olympics
Olympic judoka of Russia
World judo champions
Goodwill Games medalists in judo
Competitors at the 1990 Goodwill Games